Verhulivka is an urban-type settlement in Alchevsk Raion (district) in Luhansk Oblast of eastern Ukraine. Population:

Demographics
Native language distribution as of the Ukrainian Census of 2001:
 Ukrainian: 12.81%
 Russian: 87.12%
 Others 0.07%

References

Urban-type settlements in Alchevsk Raion